Silvio Leonardi, (1914-1990) was an Italian politician. From 1969 to 1984, he served as a Member of the European Parliament (MEP). He was a member of the Communist Party of Italy. From 1978 to 1979 he served as Chair of the Committee on the Rules of Procedure and Petitions and Vice-Chair of the Committee on Economic and Monetary Affairs

References

1914 births
1990 deaths
Politicians from Turin
MEPs for Italy 1958–1979
MEPs for Italy 1979–1984
Italian Communist Party MEPs